Deuterarcha xanthomela is a moth of the family Crambidae described by Edward Meyrick in 1884. It is found in Australia.

Gallery

References

Moths described in 1884
Spilomelinae